Daniel Nestor and Nenad Zimonjić defeated Bob Bryan and Mike Bryan in the final, 6–4, 6–1, to win the doubles tennis title at the 2009 Monte-Carlo Masters. Nestor completed the career Golden Masters in doubles with the win.

Rafael Nadal and Tommy Robredo were the defending champions, but Nadal chose not to participate. Robredo partnered with Albert Montañés, but they lost in the second round to Lukáš Dlouhý and Leander Paes.

Seeds
All seeds receive a bye into the second round.

Draw

Finals

Top half

Bottom half

References
Doubles Draw

Doubles